The Liga Panameña de Fútbol (LPF) is the top division football league in Panama. Until 2009, the league was named Asociación Nacional Pro Fútbol (ANAPROF).

Competition format
The league's season is divided into two tournaments called the Apertura and Clausura. Teams are divided into two Conferences (Eastern and Western). The Eastern Conference is composed by: Tauro, Plaza Amador, Alianza, Club Deportivo del Este, Arabe Unido, and Sporting San Miguelito, while the Western Conference is composed by: Herrera FC, Club Atletico Independiente, Veraguas, Club Universitario, Chiriqui, and San Francisco. Both tournaments have an identical format. Each tournament has two stages: the first stage is a one and a half round-robin round where each team plays every other team twice in the same conference, once at home and once away, and one time against each team from the other conference. The top three teams advance to a final stage, a single-elimination culminating with a final match. Final Stage is composed by 3 rounds. First Round teams placed at 2nd will play teams placed at 3rd (2nd placed Eastern Conference vs 3rd place Western Conference and 2nd place Western Conference vs 3rd Place Eastern Conference) . The winners will go through to semifinals where they meet the 1st teams ranked on each conference (1st in Western Conference vs Winner of 2ECvs3WC and 1st in Eastern Conference vs 2WCvs3EC). Semifinals are two legged matches. Then, the championship final is a one-off match in a neutral venue (similar to American football's Super Bowl championship matches).

Each Apertura & Clausura tournament has 16 matches of regular season (twice (2) against each team (5) of same conference + once (1) against each team (6) in the opposite conference). 
Final stage has a total of: 2 matches in First Round Playoffs + 4 matches in Semifinals + 1 match in Final.
First Round of Playoff are 1 leg matches (2nd place team in each conference plays at Home).
Semifinals are 2 leg matches (Home & Away).
Finals are 1 leg match in a neutral venue.

Regarding schedule in regular season: 
Schedule for each tournament (Apertura & Clausura) is set up into 16 match days. 
10 matches against teams within same conference and 6 matches against opposing conference. 
In the Apertura, teams of the Eastern Conference will face only one time teams of the Western Conference. The team that plays home at the Apertura will have to play away when facing same team at the Clausura. This way the League can assure that Eastern Conference and Western Conference will face each other at Home & Away at the end of both tournaments. When playing against teams within the same conference, each team will face Home & Aways matches in both Apertura and Clausura.

The first stage of both tournaments is combined into an aggregate table to determine relegation. The team with the fewest points is relegated to the Primera A for the following season.

The champions of both tournaments + the next best ranked team qualify to the CONCACAF Central American Cup. Beforehand, via the CONCACAF League, 3 teams used to classify as well. As well, starting from 2023, the winners of both the Apertura & Clausura tournaments will classify for Copa Libertadores, while the runners-up classify for Copa Sudamericana.

History

In 1987, a group of men, composed of Giancarlo Gronchi, Jan Domburg, Edgar Plazas, Jorge Zelasny, Ángel Valero and Juan Carlos Delgado, met and founded the Asociación Nacional Pro-Fútbol (ANAPROF for short), which was inaugurated on February 26, 1988.

Their objective was to organize professional football in Panama, in order to help the Panama national team in the long term.

Founding teams
Chirilanco (Bocas del Toro)
Deportivo la Previsora (La Chorrera)
Deportivo Perú (Panama City)
Euro Kickers (Panama City)
Plaza Amador (Panama City)
Tauro (Panama City)

Timeline
The league was founded as ANAPROF in 1988 after years of turmoil in Panamanian football. The first season, which featured six teams, began on February 26, 1988. Six teams participated. From that year until 2001, the league used a "long tournament" format in which every team played every other team in a home and away set. Since 2001, the league has used the Apertura/Clausura split season that is common to Latin America.
From 1994 to 1996, Panamanian football was rent by a schism between ANAPROF and a rival league, LINFUNA. The split was resolved in 1996–97 when the leagues merged into a single twelve-team tournament.
The next few seasons of league football were a bit confusing as the governing body tried to sort out its formats.  In 1997–98, the league was split into two groups for the regular season, followed by an eight-team playoff.  In 1998–99, the league shrunk to ten teams, with six of them advancing to a post-season tournament. The top four advanced further to a playoff to determine the champion. A similar format was used in 1999-2000 and 2000–2001.
In 2001, the Apertura/Clausura format was adopted, and with modifications has been used ever since. The most significant involved the idea of the Grand Championship playoff. From 2001 to 2007, the winner of the Apertura faced the winner of the Clausura to determine a season champion. After 2007, this idea was abandoned.
In 2009 ANAPROF changes its name to Liga Panameña de Fútbol.
 In 2021, LPF made changes to the Panamanian football structure, top-tier teams now will be considered as franchises and expanded the league from 10 to 12 teams with no relegation. The second-tier league will increase from 8 to 24 teams by combining top-tier teams U-20 teams, second-tier teams, and invitational teams.

LINFUNA Era 
In 1994 Panamanian soccer suffered a great division, when the LINFUNA league was created, the league had Panamanian Football Federation approval and FIFA recognition. It was presided by Rolando Marco Hermoso, then succeeded by Ariel Alvarado.
ANAPROF teams Projusa FC and Alianza FC, were brought into the organization.
The league organized two championships (1994 and 1995), both won by C.D. Árabe Unido from Colón.
Following mediation by CONCACAF, on January 6, 1996, the leagues were unified under the ANAPROF name.

1994 Participating teams 
Árabe Unido, Projusa (Veraguas), Chorrillo, Alianza FC, Internacional Puerto Armuelles, Tulihueca de La Chorrera, Corporación Deportiva Independiente Municipal Panamá (DIM), Vista Alegre, Cruz Azul (David, Chiriquí) y el Altamira - Cosmos,

1995 Participating teams 
Árabe Unido, Projusa, Internacional Puerto Armuelles, Tulihueca de La Chorrera, Cosmos, Chorrillo, Alianza, Corporación Deportiva Independiente Municipal Panamá (DIM), Tigres de Vista Alegre y Cruz Azul.

2023 teams

Championships by team

1 Including 2 Winners in LINFUNA. 
2 Including 2 Runners-up under the name Deportivo La Previsora. 
 Teams dissolved.

Results by year
The following table shows past results for ANAPROF (1988-09) and the Liga Panameña de Fútbol (2009–present)

Top-scorers by season

See also
 Panamanian football clubs in CONCACAF competitions

References

External links
Liga Panameña de Fútbol (Official Page-Spanish)
LPF Website (unofficial)
Panama-List of Champions
 ANAPROF club participation in UNCAF tournament
 Federaciòn Panameña de Fùtbol (fepafut.com)
Panama - List of Champions, RSSSF.com

 
1
Panama
1988 establishments in Panama
Sports leagues established in 1988